Robert H. Lipsitz (8 Oct 1942 - 10 May 2020) is an American bridge player from Annandale, Virginia.

Bridge accomplishments

Wins

 North American Bridge Championships (6)
 von Zedtwitz Life Master Pairs (1) 1976 
 Nail Life Master Open Pairs (1) 1982 
 Grand National Teams (3) 1984, 1988, 1992 
 Senior Knockout Teams (1) 1999

Runners-up

 North American Bridge Championships
 von Zedtwitz Life Master Pairs (2) 1977, 1982 
 Grand National Teams (2) 1977, 1985 
 Senior Knockout Teams (1) 2000 
 Chicago Mixed Board-a-Match (1) 1973 
 Reisinger (2) 1976, 1977

Notes

Living people
American contract bridge players
1942 births
Place of birth missing (living people)
Date of birth missing (living people)
People from Annandale, Virginia